Peter Alan Wilkinson (27 June 1933 – 28 March 2014) was a male athlete who competed for England.

Athletics career
He represented England and won a bronze medal in the marathon at the 1958 British Empire and Commonwealth Games in Cardiff, Wales.

References

1933 births
2014 deaths
English male marathon runners
Commonwealth Games medallists in athletics
Commonwealth Games bronze medallists for England
Athletes (track and field) at the 1958 British Empire and Commonwealth Games
Medallists at the 1958 British Empire and Commonwealth Games